The Progressive Conservative Party of New Brunswick held a leadership election in 1997 to replace its outgoing leader Bernard Valcourt.  The winner was Bernard Lord who would go on to win the riding of Moncton East in a by-election and lead the party to victory in the 1999 and 2003 elections.

Results

References 

1997 elections in Canada
Progressive Conservative Party of New Brunswick leadership elections
1997 in New Brunswick
Progressive Conservative Party of New Brunswick leadership election